The Journal of Comparative Germanic Linguistics is a peer-reviewed academic journal covering theoretical linguistic research of the Germanic languages, published by Springer Netherlands. Its editor-in-chief is Susi Wurmbrand (University of Vienna).

References

Linguistics journals
Germanic philology journals
English-language journals
Triannual journals
Springer Science+Business Media academic journals
Publications established in 1997
Comparative linguistics